The University of North Texas Opera, aka UNT Opera Workshop, is the student performing company of the Opera Studies Department of the Vocal Studies Division (one of eight divisions) of the University of North Texas College of Music.

History 
Founded in 1944 by the college's dean, Wilfred Bain, and a newly appointed artist-in-residence, Mary McCormic, the Opera Workshop has presented one or more operatic productions every semester since inception — fully mounted with orchestra, set, lighting, and costumes.  Opera productions at the College of Music predate the founding of the Opera Workshop.  In one notable instance, in 1938, North Texas produced Cynthia Parker, an opera by Julia Smith, who had graduated from North Texas in 1930.

UNT College of Music divisions

Directors, Past & Present

Notable people
Faculty
 Richard Croft
 Mary McCormic
 Richard Sparks

Alumni
 John Ardoin
 William Blankenship
 Latonia Moore
 Mark Nicolson
 Geeta Novotny
 Patricia Racette
 Julia Smith

See also
 The Scarecrow (opera)

External links 
 University of North Texas College of Music
 Opera Studies
 University of North Texas Opera

References 

University of North Texas
Musical groups from Denton, Texas
Texas classical music
1944 establishments in Texas
Musical groups established in 1944
Music